Dzari is a settlement at the head of the river Kornisistskali (left tributary of the Eastern Fron) in the  Tskhinvali District of South Ossetia, Georgia.  It is located  12 kilometers west of Tskhinvali.  Community center, villages: Brili, Gardanta, Dampaleti, Zemo Dodoti, Kverneti, Mebrune, Rustavi, Kvemo Dodoti, Chelekhsata, Jabita.

Geography 
Located on Shida Kartli plain.   1200 meters (4,049 foot) above sea level.

History 
According to 1847 data, Dzari was included in the villages of the Kornisi Valley and was inhabited by ethnic Ossetians.  Until 1991 it was part of the Tskhinvali region. It has been occupied by Russia since 2008 and de facto controls Republic of South Ossetia.

On May 20, 1992, on the road from the village, the Zar tragedy occurred - during which a column of refugees was shot by Georgian militants.

The village is famous for the "Zarskaya bypass road", or "The road of life" from Tskhinval to Vladikavkaz. A memorial complex to the victims of the war was built on the territory of the village.

See also
 Dzari Tragedy
 Battle of Tskhinvali

Notes

References  

Populated places in Tskhinvali District